Plus TV is a private national free-to-air television channel. It is the sixth private TV channel established in Cyprus. Its first official broadcast took place on July 28, 2006.

History
Its first official broadcast was in the mid-2000s as Astra TV until 2005 when it was renamed to Axia Channel while on July 28, 2006 it changed to CNC Plus TV, where CNC meaning Cyprus New Channel broadcasting a pilot program with children's and music shows, while from January 2007, it broadcasts under its current name (Plus TV) with the acronym CNC later removed from August of the same year.

Earlier, in July 2006, it maintained a partnership with Alter Channel while also including more Cypriot productions and partnership with Greek Alpha TV and 902 TV. In September 2007 the channel changed ownership making rapid improvements.

At the end of the 2009-2010 season Plus TV occupied the lowest audience share among the nationwide channels, with direct implications for advertising value.

In 2009, it stopped cooperation with these three channels and started new with Star Channel, broadcasting most of its program, which has been broadcast since 2015 by Omega having an exclusive cooperation with him.

In 2016, Plus was acquired by Filippos Vryonis, who three years before bought 902 TV, turning it into Epsilon, while also owning two regional channels in Greece (Extra and AB) with the aim of renaming the all-Cypriot channel to Epsilon Cyprus. However, the plan was aborted due to continued obstacles from the Cyprus Radio and Television Authority and a lack of data. Previously, since 2013 when the then pan-Hellenic Epsilon started broadcasting, had signed a collaboration with the also all-Cypriot Capital TV in Limassol.

In September 2018, there was a dispute between Plus and the then TV One (before it became Omega the following month) over the cooperation and broadcasting of programs of the renamed Epsilon/Open channel due to a change of ownership a year before. Due to these changes, the channel started cooperation with New Epsilon, having a shorter range in Greece, replacing Extra, which returned to AB's frequencies.

References

Greek-language television stations
Television channels and stations established in 2006
Television channels in Cyprus